Oliver Township is one of the fifteen townships of Adams County, Ohio, United States.  As of the 2010 census the population was 1,319.

Geography
Located in the central part of the county, it borders the following townships:
Scott Township - north
Meigs Township - east
Tiffin Township - south
Wayne Township - west

No municipalities are located in Oliver Township.

Name and history
Oliver Township was organized in 1853. It was named for John Oliver, a county commissioner.

It is the only Oliver Township statewide.

Government
The township is governed by a three-member board of trustees, who are elected in November of odd-numbered years to a four-year term beginning on the following January 1. Two are elected in the year after the presidential election and one is elected in the year before it. There is also an elected township fiscal officer, who serves a four-year term beginning on April 1 of the year after the election, which is held in November of the year before the presidential election. Vacancies in the fiscal officership or on the board of trustees are filled by the remaining trustees.

References

External links
County website

Townships in Adams County, Ohio
1853 establishments in Ohio
Populated places established in 1853
Townships in Ohio